Insight Academy School Bangalore is located on Upper Ring Road, Kanakrapura, Bangalore, India . A new branch has opened up at Marathahalli. After preschool, the school follows the Indian Certificate of Secondary Education, ICSE stream of syllabus from Grade 1 to Grade 10. It started on 15 August 2007.

Mrs. May Ruth Dsouza is the  Academic Directress.

The academy is managed by the Insight Educational Trust.

Insight Kidz caters to pre schooling education from Nursery to Upper kindergarten through a syllabus which is a combination of Montessori and traditional methods.

See also

 Greenwood High International School
 Mallya Aditi International School

References

External links 
 Official website

Private schools in Bangalore